The 1915 Pittsburgh Pirates season was the 34th season of the Pittsburgh Pirates franchise; the 29th in the National League. The Pirates finished fifth in the league standings with a record of 73–81.

Regular season

Season standings

Record vs. opponents

Game log

|- bgcolor="ccffcc"
| 1 || April 14 || @ Reds || 9–2 || McQuillan (1–0) || Ames || — || 24,000 || 1–0
|- bgcolor="ffbbbb"
| 2 || April 15 || @ Reds || 1–2 || Benton || Harmon (0–1) || — || 3,000 || 1–1
|- bgcolor="ffbbbb"
| 3 || April 16 || @ Reds || 2–4 || Douglas || Vance (0–1) || Dale || — || 1–2
|- bgcolor="ccffcc"
| 4 || April 17 || @ Reds || 3–2 || Mamaux (1–0) || Brown || — || — || 2–2
|- bgcolor="ffbbbb"
| 5 || April 18 || @ Cubs || 1–2 (10) || Vaughn || Cooper (0–1) || — || — || 2–3
|- bgcolor="ffbbbb"
| 6 || April 19 || @ Cubs || 7–8 || Pierce || Harmon (0–2) || — || — || 2–4
|- bgcolor="ccffcc"
| 7 || April 20 || @ Cubs || 8–6 || Mamaux (2–0) || Cheney || McQuillan (1) || 2,000 || 3–4
|- bgcolor="ccffcc"
| 8 || April 22 || Reds || 8–2 || Adams (1–0) || Douglas || — || — || 4–4
|- bgcolor="ffbbbb"
| 9 || April 23 || Reds || 1–2 || Dale || Cooper (0–2) || Benton || 2,500 || 4–5
|- bgcolor="ffffff"
| 10 || April 24 || Reds || 1–1 (8) ||  ||  || — || 10,000 || 4–5
|- bgcolor="ffbbbb"
| 11 || April 25 || @ Cardinals || 1–8 || Doak || Kantlehner (0–1) || — || 12,000 || 4–6
|- bgcolor="ffbbbb"
| 12 || April 26 || @ Cardinals || 0–3 || Perdue || Adams (1–1) || — || — || 4–7
|- bgcolor="ffbbbb"
| 13 || April 27 || @ Cardinals || 0–3 || Griner || Mamaux (2–1) || — || — || 4–8
|- bgcolor="ccffcc"
| 14 || April 28 || @ Cardinals || 7–6 (8) || Harmon (1–2) || Sallee || Cooper (1) || — || 5–8
|- bgcolor="ffbbbb"
| 15 || April 30 || Cubs || 1–4 || Zabel || Cooper (0–3) || — || — || 5–9
|-

|- bgcolor="ffbbbb"
| 16 || May 1 || Cubs || 1–3 || Standridge || Adams (1–2) || — || 2,000 || 5–10
|- bgcolor="ffbbbb"
| 17 || May 2 || @ Cubs || 1–7 (8) || Vaughn || McQuillan (1–1) || — || — || 5–11
|- bgcolor="ffbbbb"
| 18 || May 3 || @ Cubs || 1–5 (5) || Pierce || Cooper (0–4) || Humphries || — || 5–12
|- bgcolor="ccffcc"
| 19 || May 4 || Cardinals || 4–3 (8) || Harmon (2–2) || Perdue || — || — || 6–12
|- bgcolor="ccffcc"
| 20 || May 6 || Cardinals || 9–3 || Adams (2–2) || Meadows || — || — || 7–12
|- bgcolor="ccffcc"
| 21 || May 7 || Cardinals || 6–4 || McQuillan (2–1) || Doak || — || — || 8–12
|- bgcolor="ccffcc"
| 22 || May 8 || Cardinals || 3–2 || Mamaux (3–1) || Robinson || — || — || 9–12
|- bgcolor="ccffcc"
| 23 || May 9 || @ Reds || 8–3 || Harmon (3–2) || Douglas || — || — || 10–12
|- bgcolor="ccffcc"
| 24 || May 10 || Cubs || 10–7 || Conzelman (1–0) || Zabel || Adams (1) || — || 11–12
|- bgcolor="ffbbbb"
| 25 || May 11 || @ Phillies || 2–4 || Alexander || McQuillan (2–2) || — || — || 11–13
|- bgcolor="ccffcc"
| 26 || May 13 || @ Phillies || 3–1 || Harmon (4–2) || Demaree || — || — || 12–13
|- bgcolor="ffbbbb"
| 27 || May 14 || @ Phillies || 3–5 || Rixey || Adams (2–3) || Mayer || — || 12–14
|- bgcolor="ccffcc"
| 28 || May 15 || @ Braves || 10–6 || Cooper (1–4) || Rudolph || McQuillan (2) || — || 13–14
|- bgcolor="ffbbbb"
| 29 || May 18 || @ Braves || 2–3 || James || Harmon (4–3) || — || — || 13–15
|- bgcolor="ccffcc"
| 30 || May 19 || @ Braves || 7–0 || Mamaux (4–1) || Ragan || — || — || 14–15
|- bgcolor="ccffcc"
| 31 || May 20 || @ Giants || 6–2 || Adams (3–3) || Perritt || — || — || 15–15
|- bgcolor="ffbbbb"
| 32 || May 25 || @ Robins || 1–5 || Pfeffer || McQuillan (2–3) || — || — || 15–16
|- bgcolor="ffbbbb"
| 33 || May 27 || @ Robins || 0–2 || Dell || Cooper (1–5) || — || — || 15–17
|- bgcolor="ccffcc"
| 34 || May 28 || @ Robins || 3–1 || Mamaux (5–1) || Coombs || — || — || 16–17
|- bgcolor="ffffff"
| 35 || May 29 || Cardinals || 0–0 (5) ||  ||  || — || — || 16–17
|- bgcolor="ffbbbb"
| 36 || May 29 || Cardinals || 3–5 || Meadows || McQuillan (2–4) || — || — || 16–18
|- bgcolor="ffbbbb"
| 37 || May 30 || @ Reds || 0–4 || Schneider || Harmon (4–4) || — || — || 16–19
|- bgcolor="ccffcc"
| 38 || May 31 || Cubs || 1–0 || Cooper (2–5) || Lavender || — || — || 17–19
|- bgcolor="ccffcc"
| 39 || May 31 || Cubs || 1–0 || Mamaux (6–1) || Cheney || — || 15,000 || 18–19
|-

|- bgcolor="ffbbbb"
| 40 || June 1 || Cubs || 0–2 || Zabel || Adams (3–4) || — || — || 18–20
|- bgcolor="ffbbbb"
| 41 || June 4 || Robins || 2–8 || Pfeffer || Cooper (2–6) || — || — || 18–21
|- bgcolor="ccffcc"
| 42 || June 5 || Robins || 11–0 || Mamaux (7–1) || Dell || — || 5,000 || 19–21
|- bgcolor="ccffcc"
| 43 || June 7 || Robins || 6–1 || Adams (4–4) || Coombs || — || — || 20–21
|- bgcolor="ffbbbb"
| 44 || June 8 || Robins || 3–4 || Smith || McQuillan (2–5) || Pfeffer || 1,800 || 20–22
|- bgcolor="ccffcc"
| 45 || June 9 || Braves || 7–3 || Mamaux (8–1) || Tyler || — || — || 21–22
|- bgcolor="ccffcc"
| 46 || June 10 || Braves || 2–1 || Harmon (5–4) || Hughes || — || — || 22–22
|- bgcolor="ffbbbb"
| 47 || June 12 || Braves || 2–8 || Ragan || Adams (4–5) || — || — || 22–23
|- bgcolor="ffbbbb"
| 48 || June 14 || Phillies || 1–4 (11) || Alexander || Mamaux (8–2) || — || 3,500 || 22–24
|- bgcolor="ccffcc"
| 49 || June 16 || Phillies || 2–1 || Harmon (6–4) || Chalmers || — || — || 23–24
|- bgcolor="ffbbbb"
| 50 || June 17 || Giants || 1–3 || Marquard || McQuillan (2–6) || — || — || 23–25
|- bgcolor="ccffcc"
| 51 || June 18 || Giants || 7–5 || Mamaux (9–2) || Perritt || Adams (2) || — || 24–25
|- bgcolor="ccffcc"
| 52 || June 19 || Giants || 4–0 || Harmon (7–4) || Tesreau || — || — || 25–25
|- bgcolor="ccffcc"
| 53 || June 21 || Phillies || 4–3 (13) || Mamaux (10–2) || Rixey || — || — || 26–25
|- bgcolor="ccffcc"
| 54 || June 22 || @ Reds || 3–1 || McQuillan (3–6) || Schneider || — || — || 27–25
|- bgcolor="ccffcc"
| 55 || June 23 || @ Reds || 6–2 || Harmon (8–4) || Benton || — || — || 28–25
|- bgcolor="ffbbbb"
| 56 || June 24 || Reds || 3–5 || Toney || Mamaux (10–3) || — || — || 28–26
|- bgcolor="ccffcc"
| 57 || June 26 || Reds || 6–3 || McQuillan (4–6) || Dale || — || 6,000 || 29–26
|- bgcolor="ccffcc"
| 58 || June 29 || @ Cardinals || 8–5 || Adams (5–5) || Meadows || — || — || 30–26
|- bgcolor="ffbbbb"
| 59 || June 29 || @ Cardinals || 4–6 || Robinson || Cooper (2–7) || Griner || 10,000 || 30–27
|- bgcolor="ffbbbb"
| 60 || June 30 || @ Cardinals || 0–2 || Doak || Adams (5–6) || — || — || 30–28
|- bgcolor="ccffcc"
| 61 || June 30 || @ Cardinals || 4–2 (10) || McQuillan (5–6) || Sallee || — || 8,000 || 31–28
|-

|- bgcolor="ccffcc"
| 62 || July 1 || @ Cubs || 4–0 || Mamaux (11–3) || Vaughn || — || 1,500 || 32–28
|- bgcolor="ffbbbb"
| 63 || July 2 || @ Cubs || 1–2 || Pierce || Harmon (8–5) || — || 2,000 || 32–29
|- bgcolor="ffbbbb"
| 64 || July 3 || @ Cubs || 5–6 || Humphries || Cooper (2–8) || Lavender || — || 32–30
|- bgcolor="ccffcc"
| 65 || July 3 || @ Cubs || 4–2 || Adams (6–6) || Zabel || — || 12,000 || 33–30
|- bgcolor="ffbbbb"
| 66 || July 4 || @ Cubs || 5–8 || Cheney || McQuillan (5–7) || Lavender || — || 33–31
|- bgcolor="ffbbbb"
| 67 || July 5 || Cardinals || 1–3 || Doak || Mamaux (11–4) || — || — || 33–32
|- bgcolor="ccffcc"
| 68 || July 5 || Cardinals || 5–0 || Harmon (9–5) || Meadows || — || — || 34–32
|- bgcolor="ffbbbb"
| 69 || July 6 || Cardinals || 1–2 || Griner || Kantlehner (0–2) || — || 1,200 || 34–33
|- bgcolor="ffbbbb"
| 70 || July 7 || Cubs || 4–7 || Lavender || Adams (6–7) || — || — || 34–34
|- bgcolor="ccffcc"
| 71 || July 8 || @ Phillies || 2–0 || Mamaux (12–4) || Rixey || — || — || 35–34
|- bgcolor="ffbbbb"
| 72 || July 9 || @ Phillies || 1–2 || Alexander || Harmon (9–6) || — || — || 35–35
|- bgcolor="ffbbbb"
| 73 || July 10 || @ Phillies || 3–6 || Demaree || Adams (6–8) || — || 12,000 || 35–36
|- bgcolor="ccffcc"
| 74 || July 12 || @ Phillies || 2–1 || McQuillan (6–7) || Mayer || Cooper (2) || — || 36–36
|- bgcolor="ccffcc"
| 75 || July 12 || @ Phillies || 4–2 || Mamaux (13–4) || Chalmers || — || 13,000 || 37–36
|- bgcolor="ccffcc"
| 76 || July 13 || @ Braves || 3–1 || Kantlehner (1–2) || Ragan || — || — || 38–36
|- bgcolor="ffbbbb"
| 77 || July 13 || @ Braves || 6–7 || Davis || Harmon (9–7) || Hughes || — || 38–37
|- bgcolor="ffbbbb"
| 78 || July 15 || @ Braves || 2–3 || Rudolph || Cooper (2–9) || — || — || 38–38
|- bgcolor="ffbbbb"
| 79 || July 16 || @ Braves || 5–6 (15) || Hughes || Adams (6–9) || — || — || 38–39
|- bgcolor="ccffcc"
| 80 || July 17 || @ Robins || 5–3 || McQuillan (7–7) || Smith || Kantlehner (1) || — || 39–39
|- bgcolor="ffbbbb"
| 81 || July 17 || @ Robins || 3–7 (7) || Coombs || Conzelman (1–1) || — || 22,000 || 39–40
|- bgcolor="ffbbbb"
| 82 || July 19 || @ Robins || 0–3 || Rucker || Kantlehner (1–3) || — || — || 39–41
|- bgcolor="ccffcc"
| 83 || July 20 || @ Robins || 6–2 || Harmon (10–7) || Douglas || — || — || 40–41
|- bgcolor="ccffcc"
| 84 || July 23 || @ Giants || 6–1 || Adams (7–9) || Mathewson || — || — || 41–41
|- bgcolor="ccffcc"
| 85 || July 23 || @ Giants || 4–3 || Mamaux (14–4) || Tesreau || Cooper (3) || 15,000 || 42–41
|- bgcolor="ffbbbb"
| 86 || July 24 || @ Giants || 4–8 || Marquard || Harmon (10–8) || — || — || 42–42
|- bgcolor="ffbbbb"
| 87 || July 24 || @ Giants || 2–4 || Perritt || Cooper (2–10) || — || — || 42–43
|- bgcolor="ccffcc"
| 88 || July 26 || @ Giants || 2–1 || Adams (8–9) || Mathewson || — || — || 43–43
|- bgcolor="ffbbbb"
| 89 || July 26 || @ Giants || 0–3 || Tesreau || McQuillan (7–8) || — || 10,000 || 43–44
|- bgcolor="ccffcc"
| 90 || July 27 || Giants || 8–1 || Mamaux (15–4) || Marquard || — || 4,000 || 44–44
|- bgcolor="ccffcc"
| 91 || July 29 || Robins || 8–2 || Kantlehner (2–3) || Pfeffer || — || 2,500 || 45–44
|- bgcolor="ffbbbb"
| 92 || July 30 || Robins || 2–3 || Rucker || Harmon (10–9) || — || — || 45–45
|- bgcolor="ccffcc"
| 93 || July 31 || Robins || 5–0 || Mamaux (16–4) || Appleton || — || — || 46–45
|- bgcolor="ccffcc"
| 94 || July 31 || Robins || 5–4 (10) || McQuillan (8–8) || Pfeffer || — || 12,000 || 47–45
|-

|- bgcolor="ffbbbb"
| 95 || August 3 || Braves || 4–5 || Ragan || Kantlehner (2–4) || Hughes || — || 47–46
|- bgcolor="ffbbbb"
| 96 || August 3 || Braves || 2–7 || Tyler || Harmon (10–10) || — || — || 47–47
|- bgcolor="ffbbbb"
| 97 || August 4 || Braves || 1–5 || Hughes || Mamaux (16–5) || — || — || 47–48
|- bgcolor="ccffcc"
| 98 || August 5 || Phillies || 1–0 || Adams (9–9) || Alexander || — || — || 48–48
|- bgcolor="ffbbbb"
| 99 || August 6 || Phillies || 4–5 || Demaree || McQuillan (8–9) || Mayer || — || 48–49
|- bgcolor="ccffcc"
| 100 || August 7 || Phillies || 9–0 || Mamaux (17–5) || Mayer || — || — || 49–49
|- bgcolor="ccffcc"
| 101 || August 7 || Phillies || 6–0 || Harmon (11–10) || Rixey || — || — || 50–49
|- bgcolor="ccffcc"
| 102 || August 10 || Giants || 8–2 || Adams (10–9) || Marquard || — || — || 51–49
|- bgcolor="ccffcc"
| 103 || August 12 || Giants || 4–0 || Mamaux (18–5) || Tesreau || — || — || 52–49
|- bgcolor="ffbbbb"
| 104 || August 13 || Reds || 3–4 || McKenry || Harmon (11–11) || — || — || 52–50
|- bgcolor="ffbbbb"
| 105 || August 14 || Reds || 4–5 (11) || Lear || Kantlehner (2–5) || — || — || 52–51
|- bgcolor="ffbbbb"
| 106 || August 14 || Reds || 0–6 || Toney || McQuillan (8–10) || — || — || 52–52
|- bgcolor="ffbbbb"
| 107 || August 15 || @ Reds || 2–6 || Dale || Cooper (2–11) || — || — || 52–53
|- bgcolor="ffbbbb"
| 108 || August 15 || @ Reds || 2–6 || McKenry || Harmon (11–12) || — || — || 52–54
|- bgcolor="ccffcc"
| 109 || August 16 || Reds || 5–4 || Kantlehner (3–5) || Lear || — || — || 53–54
|- bgcolor="ffbbbb"
| 110 || August 17 || Cubs || 4–6 || Zabel || Cooper (2–12) || — || — || 53–55
|- bgcolor="ccffcc"
| 111 || August 18 || @ Phillies || 8–4 || Adams (11–9) || Mayer || — || — || 54–55
|- bgcolor="ccffcc"
| 112 || August 19 || @ Phillies || 8–3 || Harmon (12–12) || Demaree || — || — || 55–55
|- bgcolor="ffbbbb"
| 113 || August 20 || @ Phillies || 3–4 (11) || Alexander || Cooper (2–13) || — || — || 55–56
|- bgcolor="ffbbbb"
| 114 || August 21 || @ Braves || 1–3 || Rudolph || Kantlehner (3–6) || — || — || 55–57
|- bgcolor="ffbbbb"
| 115 || August 21 || @ Braves || 0–2 || Nehf || Mamaux (18–6) || — || 20,000 || 55–58
|- bgcolor="ffbbbb"
| 116 || August 23 || @ Braves || 2–3 || Hughes || Adams (11–10) || — || — || 55–59
|- bgcolor="ffbbbb"
| 117 || August 24 || @ Braves || 0–10 || Ragan || Cooper (2–14) || — || — || 55–60
|- bgcolor="ffbbbb"
| 118 || August 25 || @ Giants || 3–5 || Perritt || Harmon (12–13) || — || — || 55–61
|- bgcolor="ccffcc"
| 119 || August 25 || @ Giants || 9–7 || Mamaux (19–6) || Benton || Kantlehner (2) || — || 56–61
|- bgcolor="ccffcc"
| 120 || August 26 || @ Giants || 2–1 || Kantlehner (4–6) || Stroud || — || — || 57–61
|- bgcolor="ffbbbb"
| 121 || August 27 || @ Giants || 1–2 || Mathewson || Adams (11–11) || — || — || 57–62
|- bgcolor="ffbbbb"
| 122 || August 28 || @ Robins || 1–2 || Rucker || Harmon (12–14) || — || — || 57–63
|- bgcolor="ffbbbb"
| 123 || August 28 || @ Robins || 0–3 || Pfeffer || Kantlehner (4–7) || — || 13,000 || 57–64
|- bgcolor="ccffcc"
| 124 || August 31 || @ Robins || 5–3 || Kelly (1–0) || Coombs || Cooper (4) || — || 58–64
|- bgcolor="ffbbbb"
| 125 || August 31 || @ Robins || 2–3 || Marquard || Kantlehner (4–8) || — || — || 58–65
|-

|- bgcolor="ffbbbb"
| 126 || September 1 || Cardinals || 0–4 || Sallee || Adams (11–12) || — || — || 58–66
|- bgcolor="ccffcc"
| 127 || September 1 || Cardinals || 7–0 || Harmon (13–14) || Perdue || — || — || 59–66
|- bgcolor="ffbbbb"
| 128 || September 2 || Cardinals || 2–7 || Doak || Kelly (1–1) || — || — || 59–67
|- bgcolor="ccffcc"
| 129 || September 3 || Cubs || 4–1 || Mamaux (20–6) || Humphries || — || — || 60–67
|- bgcolor="ffbbbb"
| 130 || September 4 || Cubs || 2–5 || Vaughn || Kantlehner (4–9) || — || — || 60–68
|- bgcolor="ccffcc"
| 131 || September 4 || Cubs || 2–1 (12) || Adams (12–12) || Lavender || — || 7,000 || 61–68
|- bgcolor="ccffcc"
| 132 || September 5 || @ Cubs || 13–2 || Cooper (3–14) || Adams || — || — || 62–68
|- bgcolor="ffbbbb"
| 133 || September 6 || Reds || 0–3 || Schneider || Mamaux (20–7) || — || — || 62–69
|- bgcolor="ccffcc"
| 134 || September 6 || Reds || 5–2 || Harmon (14–14) || McKenry || — || 8,000 || 63–69
|- bgcolor="ffbbbb"
| 135 || September 7 || Reds || 3–6 || Toney || Adams (12–13) || — || — || 63–70
|- bgcolor="ccffcc"
| 136 || September 10 || Braves || 8–1 || Adams (13–13) || Nehf || — || — || 64–70
|- bgcolor="ffbbbb"
| 137 || September 10 || Braves || 2–3 (10) || Rudolph || Kantlehner (4–10) || — || 4,500 || 64–71
|- bgcolor="ffbbbb"
| 138 || September 11 || Phillies || 2–3 || Mayer || Harmon (14–15) || — || — || 64–72
|- bgcolor="ffbbbb"
| 139 || September 13 || Phillies || 2–4 (13) || Alexander || Cooper (3–15) || — || — || 64–73
|- bgcolor="ffbbbb"
| 140 || September 14 || Phillies || 3–4 || Chalmers || Adams (13–14) || — || — || 64–74
|- bgcolor="ccffcc"
| 141 || September 15 || Phillies || 1–0 || Kantlehner (5–10) || Mayer || — || — || 65–74
|- bgcolor="ffbbbb"
| 142 || September 16 || Giants || 4–8 || Tesreau || Harmon (14–16) || — || — || 65–75
|- bgcolor="ccffcc"
| 143 || September 17 || Giants || 9–6 || Cooper (4–15) || Benton || — || — || 66–75
|- bgcolor="ccffcc"
| 144 || September 17 || Giants || 5–0 || Hill (1–0) || Perritt || — || — || 67–75
|- bgcolor="ccffcc"
| 145 || September 18 || Giants || 8–2 || Mamaux (21–7) || Mathewson || — || — || 68–75
|- bgcolor="ffbbbb"
| 146 || September 18 || Giants || 2–7 || Tesreau || Kantlehner (5–11) || — || — || 68–76
|- bgcolor="ccffcc"
| 147 || September 20 || Robins || 1–0 || Harmon (15–16) || Pfeffer || — || — || 69–76
|- bgcolor="ffbbbb"
| 148 || September 22 || Robins || 2–4 || Rucker || Cooper (4–16) || — || — || 69–77
|- bgcolor="ccffcc"
| 149 || September 22 || Robins || 2–1 || Hill (2–0) || Cheney || — || — || 70–77
|- bgcolor="ccffcc"
| 150 || September 23 || Braves || 8–4 || Cooper (5–16) || Rudolph || — || — || 71–77
|- bgcolor="ffbbbb"
| 151 || September 24 || Braves || 0–2 || Nehf || Kantlehner (5–12) || — || — || 71–78
|- bgcolor="ffbbbb"
| 152 || September 25 || Braves || 2–5 || Hughes || Harmon (15–17) || — || — || 71–79
|- bgcolor="ccffcc"
| 153 || September 30 || @ Cardinals || 6–5 (10) || Harmon (16–17) || Perdue || — || — || 72–79
|-

|- bgcolor="ffbbbb"
| 154 || October 1 || @ Cardinals || 3–6 || Doak || Hill (2–1) || Sallee || — || 72–80
|- bgcolor="ffbbbb"
| 155 || October 2 || @ Cardinals || 1–3 || Ames || Mamaux (21–8) || — || — || 72–81
|- bgcolor="ccffcc"
| 156 || October 3 || @ Reds || 5–3 || Adams (14–14) || Schneider || — || — || 73–81
|-

|-
| Legend:       = Win       = Loss       = TieBold = Pirates team member

Opening Day lineup

Roster

Player stats

Batting

Starters by position 
Note: Pos = Position; G = Games played; AB = At bats; H = Hits; Avg. = Batting average; HR = Home runs; RBI = Runs batted in

Other batters 
Note: G = Games played; AB = At bats; H = Hits; Avg. = Batting average; HR = Home runs; RBI = Runs batted in

Pitching

Starting pitchers 
Note: G = Games pitched; IP = Innings pitched; W = Wins; L = Losses; ERA = Earned run average; SO = Strikeouts

Other pitchers 
Note: G = Games pitched; IP = Innings pitched; W = Wins; L = Losses; ERA = Earned run average; SO = Strikeouts

Relief pitchers 
Note: G = Games pitched; W = Wins; L = Losses; SV = Saves; ERA = Earned run average; SO = Strikeouts

References 

 1915 Pittsburgh Pirates team page at Baseball Reference
 1915 Pittsburgh Pirates Page at Baseball Almanac

Pittsburgh Pirates seasons
Pittsburgh Pirates season
Pitts